Madhav Sharma (born 12 November 1939) is an Indian-British actor.

Early life
Sharma studied at the Scottish Church College in Kolkata, India and later, at the Royal Academy of Dramatic Art in Bloomsbury, London.

Following the death of his mother, Sharma was raised in Bangalore by his grandfather and aunt, who was an independence activist and social activist on behalf of Dalit children. His uncles, K. Venkataraman, K. S. Sanjivi and K. Swaminathan, all have been conferred the Padma Awards of India in various fields.

Filmography

Film 
After graduating from RADA, Sharma decided to pursue a career in theatre and changed his stage surname to Sharma.

He played the role of Patel, a lunar penal colony prisoner in the third episode of the 1973 Doctor Who story Frontier in Space.

He played Siddique in the 2002 theatrical production Calcutta Kosher.

He would next enact the role of Sir Toby Belch in Twelfth Night, in the West End.

He voiced the character, Vikram, in the 2012 survival horror game ZombiU.

He played the part of Prem Mandal in Coronation Street. He later joined EastEnders, with his role Arshad Ahmed commencing on 1 January 2018. He departed the show on 1 November 2019.

He appeared as Suresh Dhanar, in an episode called "Who Wants to be Told Bad News" from the seventies TV series Public-Eye.

Personal life
Sharma was formerly married to the British actress Jenny Seagrove.

References

External links
 
 Madhav Sharma at Theatricalia

Living people
1939 births
Alumni of RADA
British male actors of Indian descent
British male film actors
British male stage actors
British male television actors
Indian emigrants to the United Kingdom
Scottish Church College alumni
University of Calcutta alumni